Dr. Mary Lee Edward (1885–1980) was a pioneer amongst women in medicine and a hero in the World War I. Edward was born in Petrolia, Ontario, Canada, the daughter of Alexander Clark Edward and Jennie Gertrude Dawson. Interested in research, she moved to the New York Infirmary for Women and Children in New York City where she was awarded a scholarship to study surgery for a year in Vienna. On her return she was appointed chief resident surgeon at the Infirmary.

In 1917, she volunteered for overseas service and joined the Women's Overseas Hospitals, an institution which she helped organize, supported by the National Suffrage Associations. Arriving in France on February 18, 1918, and as part of the Tenth Army, she was sent to the Chateau Ognon at Senlis on the front. There, during the great German offensive in the spring and summer, she operated on over 100 casualties in a 24-hour period, and as long as 60 hours at a stretch under enemy fire. For this, she was awarded the Croix de Guerre for her outstanding bravery and for her record of valour while under the direction of the French government.

A true medical pioneer, Dr. Edward continued her practice in New York City after the war until her 85th birthday.

A plaque is erected in her honour at the Assiginack Museum in Manitowaning, Ontario, near the Edwards family cottage. Much of the information above is excerpted or adapted from that plaque.

References 

 Assiginack Museum in Manitowaning, Ontario

External links 
 Assiginack Museum in Manitowaning, Ontario
 

Canadian military doctors
1885 births
1980 deaths
Canadian surgeons
20th-century surgeons